Neil Jeffrey Austin (born 26 April 1983) is an English former professional footballer who played as a defender. He started his career at Barnsley, and spent time playing for Darlington and Hartlepool United in the Football League, and played at non-league level with Gateshead, Shaw Lane and Gainsborough Trinity. He also earned a combined 26 Youth International Caps with England at U15 to U20 levels.

Biography

Barnsley
Born in Barnsley, Austin came through the youth ranks with his local club Barnsley F.C., playing 165 first team games, including 25 games in the 2006–07 Championship season. He made his debut on 10 August 2002 against Swindon Town.

Despite struggling with an injury for a period of the 2005–06 season, Austin still managed to make 44 appearances for the reds helping them secure their return to the Football League Championship.

Darlington
In his first season at Darlington he played 29 games and scored 2 goals, his first was a mazy run from the edge of his own 18 yard box played a one – two then finished with aplomb. His season ended early though as he collected an injury that had plagued him the previous season.

In June 2008, Austin underwent an operation on his troublesome ankle which was successful. He scored his 1st goal of the season in Darlington's 6–0 away win at Macclesfield Town, it been a nice 25 yard drive. Live on Sky Austin netted a superb 25 yard free-kick against fellow promotion hopefuls Bradford City in Darlington's 2–1 victory. The tough tackling right back put Darlington's off field problems of administration to the side and went on to make 39 appearances scoring 3 goals and receiving 4 yellow cards in the 2008–09 season. Austin's superb form saw him voted in the League 2 Team of the Season.

Hartlepool United
In June 2009, he joined Darlington's arch rivals Hartlepool United and won the Player and Players' Player of the Year Award at the end of his first season with Pools.

An injury in early February 2011 saw Austin out injured until the final two games of the season with Steve Haslam replacing him at right-back. However, he regained his place next season and played every single minute of the 2012–13 campaign, the first Hartlepool player to do so since Tommy Miller in 1999–2000.

Shaw Lane
Following his release by Hartlepool in 2015, Austin signed for Shaw Lane. He helped Shaw Lane win the Northern Premier League Division 1 South 2016–17 title, winning the Players Player of the Year award in the process.

Gainsborough Trinity
After 3 seasons with Shaw Lane, Austin joined Gainsborough Trinity following a successful trial. He made a total of 39 appearances for Gainsborough and, following the conclusion of the 2018–19 season, retired from football.

Career statistics

Honours
Barnsley
League One play-offs: 2005–06
Individual
Football League Two PFA Team of the Year: 2008–09
Hartlepool United Player of the Year: 2010
Shaw Lane Players Player of the Year: 2017

References

External links

England profile at TheFA

1983 births
Living people
Footballers from Barnsley
English footballers
Association football defenders
Barnsley F.C. players
Gateshead F.C. players
Darlington F.C. players
Hartlepool United F.C. players
English Football League players
Northern Premier League players
Shaw Lane A.F.C. players
Gainsborough Trinity F.C. players